Catherine J. Archibald (b. 17 August) is a US writer of 13 historical romance novels as Catherine Archer and Catherine Archibald since 1992 to 2003, mainly located in the medieval age.

Biography
Catherine J. Archibald was born on 17 August, and grew up in Oregon, United States, where now lives again. She married a Canadian, Steve, and had three children, they lived in Alberta during 15 years. She enrolling in nursing school twice, and sold her first novel to Harlequin Inc. in 1992.

Bibliography

As Catherine Archer

Single novels
Rose Among Thorns, 1992/07
Fire Song, 1998/08

Velvet Clayburn series
Velvet Bond, 1995/07
Velvet Touch, 1996/06

Noble series
Lady Thorn, 1997/01
Lord Sin, 1997/08

Ainsworth's Bride series
Winter's Bride, 1999/09
The Bride of Spring, 2000/06
Summer's Bride, 2001/01
Autumn's Bride, 2001/10

Dragon's Brotherhood
Dragon's Dower, 2002/02
Dragon's Knight, 2002/04
Dragon's Daughter, 2003/01

As Catherine Archibald

Single novels
Hawk's Lady, 1997/11
Loving Charity, 2000/04

References and sources

All About Romance - Connecting with Catherine Archer
Fantastic Fiction (List of book edition)

Living people
American romantic fiction writers
Year of birth missing (living people)